The Hacienda Los Torres also known as  in Lares, Puerto Rico, dates from 1846.  It was listed on the National Register of Historic Places in 2006. Designed by Jose Maria Torres y Medina, it is located at the junction of Puerto Rico Highway 111 and Puerto Rico Highway 129.

It was named one of America's 11 Most Endangered Places in 2019.

It is significant for its "type, materials, craftsmanship, and particular assembly planning". Originally part of a coffee plantation was built with trees grown onsite, many of which are now exotic and hard. Part of the exterior was built with Puerto Rican royal palm (Roystonea borinquena), rarely used in construction.

References

National Register of Historic Places in Puerto Rico
Mission Revival architecture in Puerto Rico
Buildings and structures completed in 1846
Torres
1840s establishments in Puerto Rico
Coffee production
1846 establishments in the Spanish Empire